Richard John Hoak (born December 8, 1939) is an American former football player and coach for the Pittsburgh Steelers of the National Football League (NFL).  He played college for Penn State, and was selected by the Steelers in the seventh round of the 1961 NFL Draft.  He was a running back for the Steelers from 1961 to 1970, and then became the longest tenured coach in the team's history, from 1972 to 2007.

College career
Hoak attended Penn State University from 1958 to 1961, where he was a running back for the Penn State Nittany Lions football team.  He was the Nittany Lions' most valuable player as a senior in 1960. He graduated in 1961 with a bachelor's degree in social studies. He roomed with Jim Ragano his freshman year at Penn State.

Professional career
Chosen by the Steelers in the seventh round of the 1961 NFL Draft, Hoak had an impressive career, amassing 3,965 rushing yards in 1132 attempts (3.5 avg) with 25 touchdowns.  He also caught 146 passes for 1,452 yards (9.9 avg) and 8 touchdowns. He was named to one Pro Bowl and led the team in rushing three times.  He retired after the 1970 season as Pittsburgh's number 2 all-time rusher, and is currently fifth all time in rushing yards out of all Steelers.

Coaching career
After a highly successful playing career, Hoak was hired by then-coach Chuck Noll as running backs coach in 1972, and served in that position for 20 seasons. He passed on the head coaching job with the USFL's Pittsburgh Maulers when offered it in 1983. Noll retired in 1991, and Hoak was the only one of Noll's assistants retained under his successor, Bill Cowher.

During his tenure, the Steelers rushed for over 30,000 yards (the only team to do so in this time period) and led the league in rushing yards three times. He was the position coach for Steeler greats Franco Harris and Jerome Bettis.  On January 1, 2007, Hoak announced his retirement after 45 seasons with the team: 10 as a player and 35 as a coach.

Hoak has the distinction of being the only coach to work for both Chuck Noll and Bill Cowher. At the time of his retirement, he had been a Steeler for 742 of the franchise's 1,057 games and had been involved in every title game and playoff victory during its 74 seasons up to that point in time.

Personal life
Hoak lives in Hempfield, Pennsylvania.  Hoak's wife, Lynn, died March 9, 2019.

References

External links
Pro Football Reference Bio for Dick Hoak

1939 births
Eastern Conference Pro Bowl players
American football running backs
Players of American football from Pennsylvania
Living people
Pittsburgh Steelers players
Pittsburgh Steelers coaches
Penn State Nittany Lions football players
People from Jeannette, Pennsylvania